PVD may refer to: 

 Amtrak station code for Providence Station, Providence, Rhode Island
 IATA code for T. F. Green Airport, Warwick, Rhode Island
 Paul van Dyk, German trance DJ and producer
 Peripheral vascular disease, obstruction of large arteries not within the coronary, aortic arch vasculature, or brain
 Peripheral vision (horizon) display, an aircraft cockpit instrument which assists pilots in maintaining proper attitude
 Personal Video Disc, a special format of discs created by Hasbro Inc. to be used only in their VideoNow product lines
 Physical vapor deposition, vacuum deposition methods used to deposit thin films
 Posterior vitreous detachment, a condition of the eye in which the vitreous membrane separates from the retina
 Primary vigilance disorder, another term for sluggish cognitive tempo (SCT)
 Party for Democratic Action (Partia për veprim demokratik), a political party in Serbia